The Tilden Park Golf Course is a public golf course in the San Francisco Bay Area.

Overview
Tilden Park Golf Course is a public golf course located within Tilden Regional Park in the San Francisco Bay Area.  It was designed in 1936 and opened the following year. The course record of 62 is currently held by Luke Wasson.

Scorecards

References

External links 

Golf clubs and courses in California
Sports venues in Berkeley, California